Bieber Transportation Group was an American bus company based in Kutztown, Pennsylvania, operating intercity commuter buses, charter buses, and tours.  The company provided bus service from the Reading and Lehigh Valley regions of eastern Pennsylvania to Philadelphia and New York City. The company was founded by Carl R. Bieber in 1946. Bieber ended operations on February 8, 2019.

Service

Prior to ending operations in 2019, Bieber Transportation Group provided intercity commuter bus service from points in eastern Pennsylvania to the Philadelphia Greyhound Terminal in Philadelphia and the intersection of 8th Avenue and 39th Street in the Midtown Manhattan section of New York City. Service was provided daily along a route running from Reading and the Lehigh Valley to Philadelphia and a route running from Reading and the Lehigh Valley to New York City. Bieber offered one-way and round-trip tickets along with commuter books offering multiple tickets for commuters to use in a 30-day period. Bieber also offered tour bus service to domestic and international destinations, including casino excursions to Atlantic City. The company offered charters for groups for single-day or multi-day trips along with weddings, airport transfers, casino excursions, and cruise ports.

Stop locations

Fleet
Bieber Transportation Group had a fleet of 54 buses, which included several luxury coaches. The fleet consisted of tour buses manufactured by Motor Coach Industries, Prevost, and Van Hool that can seat between 33 and 56 passengers. Amenities on the buses included heating and air conditioning, restrooms, PA system, DVD players, and AM/FM CD stereo.

Partnerships
Bieber Transportation Group served as the exclusive motorcoach carrier for sports teams such as the Lehigh Valley Phantoms, Lehigh Valley IronPigs, and the Reading Royals. The company also provided transportation to the sports teams of Muhlenberg College and DeSales University. Bieber formerly maintained a transportation relationship with Kutztown University athletics.

History
Carl R. Bieber Sr. opened a trucking company in Kutztown in 1928. He gradually added buses to his fleet; in 1946 the company began charter bus service from the Lehigh Valley. In 1976, Bieber's son Carl R. Bieber Jr. took over the company. Company founder Carl R. Bieber died in 1991. In 2001, Bieber Jr. sold the company to Steven G. Haddad, who kept the Bieber name. Bieber Jr. died on June 10, 2005 at the age of 62. Bieber acquired competitor Capitol Trailways in 2008. 

In October 2016, Bieber suspended service on a route from Schuylkill Haven and Pottsville, PA to Reading and Philadelphia. In March 2018, Bieber ended bus service along a route connecting York, Lancaster, Pottstown, Limerick, and Norristown to New York City.

In 2017, Bieber paid a $20,000 settlement to the U.S. Department of Justice for failing to comply with the Americans with Disabilities Act. In 2018, the Internal Revenue Service filed a $915,736 lien against Bieber while the state of Pennsylvania filed a $187,143 lien against the company. In May 2018, a Berks County judge ordered Bieber to pay First National Bank of Pennsylvania $450,968 as part of a lawsuit. Bieber put their bus terminal in Reading up for sale in 2018.

On July 28, 2018, the Bieber bus stop in New York City moved from the Port Authority Bus Terminal to 383 Madison Avenue at East 47th Street due to an unpaid $214,000 bill to the Port Authority of New York and New Jersey for use of the terminal. Bieber had previously missed payments to the Port Authority of New York and New Jersey and was threatened with termination notices in 2008, 2010, and 2012; with the termination in 2018 being permanent. Trans-Bridge Lines took over Bieber's gate at Port Authority Bus Terminal and implemented service from Wescosville and Hellertown to New York City. On August 20, 2018, the stop in New York City moved to West 31st Street between 7th Avenue and 8th Avenue. Starting August 27, 2018, Bieber buses heading toward New York City ran to the Weehawken Port Imperial ferry terminal in Weehawken, New Jersey, where a New York Waterway ferry provided a connection across the Hudson River to New York City; the ferry ride was included in the price of the bus ticket. On November 6, 2018, Bieber buses resumed direct service into New York City with a stop at the intersection of 8th Avenue and 39th Street, with service to Weehawken Port Imperial discontinued.

On February 8, 2019, Bieber abruptly cancelled all bus service and later announced that the company was going out of business after 72 years due to decreasing ridership and increasing expenses. During the closing, employees of the company were having trouble getting their paychecks and were seen packing up their belongings at the company headquarters in Kutztown.

References

External links

 (defunct; archived page from January 2019)

Intercity bus companies of the United States
Bus transportation in Pennsylvania
Bus transportation in New York (state)
Transport companies established in 1946
Transport companies disestablished in 2019
Companies based in Berks County, Pennsylvania
1946 establishments in Pennsylvania
2019 disestablishments in Pennsylvania
Transportation companies based in Pennsylvania